

Surname
 Alexander Abercromby (disambiguation), name of several people
Andrew Abercromby (born 1980), NASA biomedical engineer
 Billy Abercromby (born 1958), Scottish football player
David Abercromby (died 1702), Scottish physician and writer
 George Abercromby, 2nd Baron Abercromby (1770–1843), Scottish lawyer and politician
 George Abercromby, 3rd Baron Abercromby (1800–1852), Scottish soldier and politician
 George Abercromby, 4th Baron Abercromby (1838–1917), Scottish politician
 Sir George Abercromby, 8th Baronet (1886–1964), Scottish landowner
 Sir James Abercromby, 2nd Baronet (c. 1670–1734), Scottish MP for Banffshire
James Abercromby, 1st Baron Dunfermline (1776–1858), British politician and son of Ralph Abercromby
John Abercromby (monk) (died 1561), victim of the Scottish Reformation
 Sir John Abercromby (British Army officer) (1772–1817), British general and politician, son of Ralph Abercromby
John Abercromby, 5th Baron Abercromby (1841–1924), Scottish antiquary
 Julia Janet Georgiana Abercromby (1840–1915), British Courtier, Baroness and artist
 Mary Abercromby, 1st Baroness Abercromby (née Menzies, b. 1752–1821), Scottish socialite
Patrick Abercromby (1656–1716), Scottish physician and antiquarian
Ralph Abercromby (1734–1801), British general and father of James Abercromby
Ralph Abercromby, 2nd Baron Dunfermline (1803–1868), British diplomat and son of James Abercromby.
Ralph Abercromby (meteorologist) (1842–1897), Scottish meteorologist
 Robert Abercromby (disambiguation), name of several people

See also 
 Abercromby baronets
 Abercrombie (disambiguation)
 Crombie (disambiguation)